Caribbomerus similis is a species of beetle in the family Cerambycidae. It was described by Warren S. Fisher in 1932.

References

Graciliini
Beetles described in 1932